The 1931 Cleveland Indians season was their first and only in the league. They played eight of ten games on road, finishing eighth in the league.

Schedule

Standings

References

Cleveland Indians (NFL 1931) seasons
Cleveland Indians